A top banana is the boss or leader, and may refer to:

 Top Banana (video game)
 Top Banana (Arrested Development)
 Top Banana (musical), a 1951 Broadway play with comedian Phil Silvers
 Top Banana (film), a 1954 film made from the play
 Top Banana, a custom car and a winner of the 1969 Ridler Award at the Detroit Autorama
 Top Banana, a 1996 novel by Bill James
 Top Banana, a Kids programmes on TVAM From 1990 to 1992

See also
 Big Cheese (disambiguation)